Dennis M. Bushnell is a NASA scientist and lecturer. As chief scientist at NASA Langley Research Center, he is responsible for technical oversight and advanced program formulation. His work is focused mainly on new approaches to environmental issues, in particular to climate issues. Bushnell has received numerous awards for his work. Bushnell has promoted research at NASA into LENR (low energy nuclear reactions, or cold fusion).

In 1998, Bushnell was elected a member of the National Academy of Engineering for viscous flow modeling and control, turbulent drag reduction, and advanced aeronautical concepts.

Education 
Bushnell obtained his M.E. degree from the University of Connecticut in 1963 and his M.S. degree from the University of Virginia in 1967, both in the field of Mechanical Engineering.

Publications 
Future Strategic Issues/Future Warfare [Circa 2025]

Bibliography

References

External links 
 Dennis M. Bushnell, BlueTech Forum
 Dennis Bushnell, Imagine Solutions Conference & Initiatives
 Dennis M. Bushnell, lifeboat foundation
 
 Dennis Bushnell as guest in The Space Show, aired on April 27, 2008
 5 Questions for Dennis M. Bushnell (Chief Scientist at NASA) on the U.S. Space Shuttle Program, July 19, 2010, www.britannica.com
 Dennis Bushnell: Conquering Climate Change, The Futurist, May–June, 2010, World Future Society
 Dennis Bushnell: Algae: A Panacea Crop?, The Futurist, March–April 2009 Vol. 43, No. 2, World Future Society
 Jim Hidges: For Bushnell, Green Is Global, Personal, NASA
 Denise Adams: Bushnell on the Environment: 'We should have changed things 20 years ago, NASA
 Dennis M. Bushnell Future Strategic Issues/Future Warfare Circa 2025

NASA people
Year of birth missing (living people)
Living people
Place of birth missing (living people)
Members of the United States National Academy of Engineering
Cold fusion
American scientists